Lushab (also Romanized as Lūshāb) is a village in Zarkan Rural District, Meymeh District, Shahin Shahr and Meymeh County, Isfahan Province, Iran. At the 2006 census, its population was 342, in 113 families.

References 

Populated places in Shahin Shahr and Meymeh County